Zeugma may refer to:
Zeugma and syllepsis, figures of speech
 Zeugma (Commagene), an ancient settlement in Commagene (eastern Anatolia)
 Zeugma (Dacia), an ancient settlement in Dacia, mentioned by Ptolemy
 Zeugma (literary journal), a periodical
 Zeugma Systems, a telecommunications equipment supplier
 Zeugma (genus), a moth in tribe Cosymbiini

See also
 Seleucia at the Zeugma, an ancient Hellenistic city
 Zeugma Mosaic Museum, Gaziantep, Turkey